Stéphanie Alenda is a French sociologist known by her book, articles and columns about Chilean right-wing, field in which she has stood out for researching about the three main «sensibilities» within the sector: the «social», the «subsidiary» and the «ultraliberal», as reflected in «The Chilean right in times of change».

Dr. Alenda has made most of her career in Chile, where she founded the School of Sociology at Andrés Bello National University (UNAB) in 2009. She is currently the Chair of the Research Committee on Political Sociology of the International Sociological Association  (ISA) and the International Political Science Association (IPSA) (2018−2023).

Alenda has been interviewed multiple times by the newspaper Le Figaro, Qué Pasa Magazine or La Segunda. Similarly, she has also been a columnist in newspapers such as The Clinic or El Mostrador, in which she has also written columns about French political affairs.

Biography

Early life
Stéphanie Alenda graduated from the University of Nice Sophia Antipolis in 1993, where she obtained two BA degrees (i.e. Modern Literature and Literature and Spanish Civilization), followed by a Master’s degree in Literature and Spanish Civilization in 1994. While she was achieving her Postgraduate Diploma on Latin American Studies at the École des Hautes Études en Sciences Sociales in Paris, she was awarded a scholarship from the French Institute for Andean Studies to conduct her doctoral fieldwork in Bolivia.

After finishing her PhD in Political Sociology at Lille University of Science and Technology in 2001, she obtained a research grant to carry out her postdoctoral studies in 2003 at the Lavoisier Programme, French Ministry of Foreign Affairs.  

She was an assistant professor at the Institute of Public Affairs of the University of Chile and the editor of the Institute’s political science journal, Revista Política (2004–2012).

Sociology at UNAB: 2009−present
In 2009, she founded the School of Sociology at Andrés Bello National University (UNAB). According to information from the university, Alenda has been part of the Executive Board of the Research Committee in Political Sociology (CPS) since 2015, which is affiliated to the International Sociological Association (ISA) and the International Political Science Association (IPSA). In 2016, she reached an agreement with the Brazilian Political Science Association (ABCP) for the CPS to have a stable presence at each meeting. In this regard, Alenda stated:

In 2018, she became the Director of Research of UNAB Faculty of Education and Social Sciences. In the same year, she was elected to serve as the Chair of the Research Committee on Political Sociology (2018−2023).

She gained renown in January 2020 during a seminar organized by the Centre of Public Studies (Centro de Estudios Públicos; CEP) called “The Chilean right in times of change” («La derecha chilena en época de cambios»), which had Carmen Le Foulon (Coordinator of the Public Opinion Area, CEP) and Julieta Suárez-Cao (Associate Professor, Institute of Political Science, PUC) as keynote speakers as well. In her presentation, she previewed the main findings of her book «Anatomía de la derecha chilena: Estado, mercado y valores en tiempos de cambio» (Anatomy of the Chilean Right: State, Market and Values in times of change). The presentation was commented by the presidents of the then three main parties of the right-wing coalition Chile Vamos: Mario Desbordes (RN), Hernán Larraín Matte (Evópoli) and Jacqueline van Rysselberghe (UDI). The book was published in March 2020 by the Fondo de Cultura Económica and, despite the challenges posited by the Covid-19 pandemic, the first printing quickly sold-out.

Works

Books
 Anatomy of the Chilean right-wing: State, market and values in times of changes. Santiago, Chile, Fondo de Cultura Económica, 2020.

Articles
 «Les avatars de la « nouvelle droite » chilienne: La fabrique d'une institution partisane (1967−2010)». Politix Magazine. Vol 106. N°2. pp. 159−187 (28 pages). 2014.
 «Cambio e institucionalización de la "nueva derecha" Chilena (1967−2010)». Revista de Sociología e Politica. Vol 22. N°52. pp. 159−180 (21 pages). 2014.
 «La batalla por las ideas en tiempos posideológicos: Adaptaciones y permanencias ideológicas en la nueva centroderecha chilena». Revista de Sociologia e Politica. N°70. Article e004. 2019.
 «How similar are the attitudes of male and female party leaders? Gender gaps and moderation in the chilean center-right». Economics and Politics Magazine. N°1. Vol. 6. pp. 31−58 (27 pages). 2020. 
 «The Chilean right at the crossroads: counterhegemony of subnational and solidary leaderships». CIDOB d'Afers Internacionals Magazine. N°126, pp. 65-87 (22 pages). 2020.
 «Satisfaction and recognition in precarious occupations: The case of waste collectors in Chile». Left-wings Magazine. N°49. pp. 848−865 (17 pages). 2020.
 «Ni crisis ni panaceas. Dinámicas y transformaciones de los sistemas partidarios en América Latina». Colombia International Magazine. N°103. pp. 3−28 (25 pages). July 2020.

References

External links
 
 

 

French people of Spanish descent
French sociologists
People from Nice
Côte d'Azur University alumni
School for Advanced Studies in the Social Sciences alumni
Lille University of Science and Technology alumni
Academic staff of the Andrés Bello National University
International Political Science Association scholars
Living people

Year of birth missing (living people)